The Com-Pac Legacy, also called the Com-Pac Legacy 17, is an American trailerable sailboat that was designed as a pocket cruiser and first built in 2006.

The Com-Pac Legacy is a development of the 1972 Com-Pac 16.

Production
The design is built by Com-Pac Yachts in the United States, starting in 2006 and it remains in production.

Design
The Com-Pac Legacy is a recreational keelboat, built predominantly of fiberglass, with wood trim. It has a fractional sloop rig; a plumb stem; a reverse transom that slopes to a plumb transom; a transom-hung, kick-up rudder controlled by a tiller and a fixed stub keel, with a centerboard. It displaces  and carries  of lead ballast.

The design incorporates a folding boom and mast that allows the mainsheet to be unhooked, the boom to be folded up against the mast and then the mast pivoted aft to lay on a transom-mounted crutch, making launching and recovery from the trailer easier.

The boat is normally fitted with a small  outboard motor for docking and maneuvering.

The design has sitting or sleeping accommodation for two people below decks. The head is a portable type.

Operational history
In a 2010 review Steve Henkel wrote, "the Com-Pac Legacy 17 is the successor to the Com-Pac 16, the first sailboat the Hutchins Company built, back in 1975, The new ... boat has gained three inches on the waterline compared to her older sister, adding a theoretical half a knot to her maximum speed. She is also 100 pounds lighter, with 50 of  those coming out her [of] lead ballast. Most other dimensions remain the same as the original Com-Pac 16 ... While sailing, a slightly taller rig should make her faster in light air compared to her older sister. Worst features: Compared with her comp[etitor]s, relatively low headroom and narrow beam somewhat restrict cabin space."

See also
List of sailing boat types

Related development
Com-Pac 16

References

External links

Keelboats
2000s sailboat type designs
Sailing yachts
Trailer sailers
Sailboat types built by Com-Pac Yachts
Sailboat type designs by Clark Mills